Michael Nankin (born December 26, 1955) is an American film and television writer, director and producer. He has been nominated for the Humanitas Prize for his writing.

Career
Nankin's film career began in 1976 with a short film called Gravity. Nankin co-wrote and co-directed the project with David Wechter. The pair followed this up with another short, Junior High School. They produced their first feature-length project in 1980, a comedy called Midnight Madness. Nankin scripted a horror film called The Gate which was released in 1987. The film marked the acting debut of Stephen Dorff. The same year he received a screenplay credit for Russkies. In 1989 he wrote a sequel to The Gate entitled The Gate II: Trespassers.

Nankin became involved in television as a director, writer and producer on Life Goes On in 1990. The series was created by Michael Braverman and focused on a Chicago family. He joined the series in its second season as a producer. He was promoted to supervising producer for the third season. He was promoted to co-executive producer for the fourth season. He scripted nine episodes of the series before its cancellation in 1993. He also directed eight episodes of the series. Nankin also wrote for Picket Fences in 1992.

In 1994 Nankin became a consulting producer, writer and director for Chicago Hope. Nankin was nominated for a Humanitas Prize in the 60 minute category for his work on the Chicago Hope episode "Shutt Down" (co-written with Michael Braverman). He returned to Picket Fences as a director and producer in 1995, directing a single episode. He also wrote the story for a pilot episode for a new version of Flipper but was not involved with the ongoing series that followed.

Nankin worked as a writer and director for American Gothic in 1995 and 1996. He wrote and directed the episode "Potato Boy" and directed a second episode. He also directed episodes of Moloney and Early Edition in 1996. Nankin served as a co-executive producer on the action series Roar in 1997. Nankin wrote one episode and directed one episode of the series, which starred Heath Ledger. Only 13 episodes were produced and the second half of the series did not air until 2000.

In 2000 Nankin directed episodes of Strong Medicine and Cover Me: Based on the True Life of an FBI Family. In 2001 he directed the TV movie The Agency and several episodes of the series that followed the film. In 2002 Nankin directed the pilot episode for a series called Septuplets. Nankin was also credited as an executive producer. The pilot was not picked up by a network. He also directed episodes of Monk that year.

In 2004 Nankin served as a consulting producer for the short lived WB family drama The Mountain. He wrote one episode of the series. He directed episodes of Veritas: The Quest and Invasion in 2005.

He worked as a regular director for the reimagined Battlestar Galactica. His involvement with the series began in 2005 with the second season and he directed eight episodes before its conclusion in 2009. He often worked alongside writing team Bradley Thompson and David Weddle and five of his eight episodes were scripted by the pair. While working on Battlestar Galactica, Nankin also directed episodes of The Dresden Files, Terminator: The Sarah Connor Chronicles, and Eureka. He also directed the TV movie Break-In in 2006.

In 2009 Nankin followed Thompson and Weddle from Battlestar Galactica to CSI: Crime Scene Investigation and he directed their script for the twentieth episode of the ninth season. In 2020, he directed an episode on The Good Lord Bird.

References

External links
 

Living people
American television directors
American television writers
American male television writers
American male screenwriters
Television producers from California
People from Hollywood, Los Angeles
1955 births
Screenwriters from California